Wattsville is a small village in the Sirhowy Valley, eight miles north west of Newport, built in the 20th century for accommodation for mine workers.

Amenities
Modern Wattsville consists of two villages, Wattsville and Brynawel. It consists of one main street (Islwyn road) with another hugging the valley below.  Wattsville is the base for the Sirhowy valley country park, starting at the tourist centre in Full Moon Cottage (the site of an 19th century village of Full moon, a site for hillwalking and mountain biking on the old railway trackbed.

History
Further up the valley at Cwmfelinfach is the old site of Nine Mile Point Colliery.  This was the site of the first ever 'sit in' of miners. At Wattsville the New Risca Mine, opened 1878 and was 855 feet deep. It was located on the eastern edge of Wattsville and was the first colliery in South Wales to have electric lighting at the pithead and underground in 1892.

The bassist and lyricist of Manic Street Preachers Nicky Wire lived in Wattsville and wrote a song about the village called "Wattsville Blues", where he describes his love of the village. The song appears on the album Know Your Enemy.

About halfway up the main street, there is a noticeable gap in the terrace. This is where 4 houses used to stand, which were flattened due to subsidence from underground mine workings. There is now a monument and garden on the site. There is a similar gap next to the play area on Duffryn Terrace.

Wattsville is home to Wattsville football club Wattsville F.C.

Notable people
Osi Rhys Osmond, artist

External links

www.geograph.co.uk : photos of Wattsville and surrounding area
Welsh Coal Mines website - check out the history of the local pits

Villages in Caerphilly County Borough